The Sanborn Central School District is a public school district in Sanborn County, based in Forestburg, South Dakota.

This district was previously known as Artesian-Letcher School District

Schools
The Sanborn Central School District has one elementary school, one middle school and one high school.

Elementary schools 
 Sanborn Central Elementary School

Middle school
 Sanborn Central Middle School

High school
 Sanborn Central High School

External links
 Sanborn Central School District
 Great Schools, Inc
 education.com

References

School districts in South Dakota